Bourbon Christian School is a private Christian school located in Bourbon, Indiana.

See also
 List of high schools in Indiana

References

External links
 https://www.bourbonchristianacademy.org

Christian schools in Indiana
Buildings and structures in Marshall County, Indiana